Choking on Lilies is the debut studio album of Hexedene, released in 1997 by Matrix Cube. The album was re-issued in 1998 with an expanded and rearranged track listing by Re-Constriction Records.

Reception
Scott Hefflon of Lollipop Magazine gave Choking on Lilies a positive review, saying "a nice break from all the boring electro" and "a band like this that carries off the aloof aggression of electro, rocking out, and sweet, ethereal vocals is quite a find." Despite criticizing the overabundance of remixes, Sonic Boom also gave the album a positive write-up, saying that "Katie had a very strong vocal range that could be very lush on slower tracks like 'Everything and Nothing' or more aggressive such as on 'Only Human'. Ian's guitar work was always complimentary, never dominating or hiding in the final mixdown. These elements combined with Jonathan's obvious electronic wizardry was bordering on perfection."

Track listing

Accolades

Personnel
Adapted from the Choking on Lilies liner notes.

Hexedene
 Katie Helsby – lead vocals
 Ian Palmer – guitar
 Jonathan Sharp – programming, guitar, photography

Production and design
 Séba Dolimont – production and engineering (11)
 Loretta Sterling – production, photography
 Stuart Turnbull – photography

Release history

References

External links 
 

1997 debut albums
Hexedene albums
Re-Constriction Records albums